Bill Redell (born April 17, 1941) is a former American football coach and member of the College Football Hall of Fame. Redell served as head coach at Crespi Carmelite High School in Encino, California, where in 1986, he led the Celts to a 13-1 record and the CIF-SS Big Five Conference Championship, avenging their only regular season loss with a 49-14 victory over St.John Bosco High at Anaheim Stadium.  Redell also coached at Oaks Christian High School in Westlake Village, California and developed them into one of California's better high school football programs. The Oaks Christian Lions finished sixth on the final USA Today prep football Super25 ranking of 2006.

Redell played quarterback at San Marino High School in San Marino, California, earning a scholarship from the University of Southern California (USC), but later transferred to play at Occidental College, in 1962 and 1963. In his two years at Occidental he passed for 1,567 yards and rushed for 1,583. He passed for 11 touchdowns and rushed for eight. He completed 68 percent of pass attempts. He averaged 6.3 yards on each rushing attempt. He played cornerback on defense and had seven pass interceptions in his career. He did the team's punting and place kicking, making 36 of 43 extra-point attempts. He led Occidental to two championships in the Southern California Intercollegiate Athletic Conference and was named to the NAIA All-America team in 1963.

After college, Redell  played six years in the Canadian Football League (CFL) for the Edmonton Eskimos, Hamilton Tiger-Cats, and Calgary Stampeders. In 1970, he became a football coach. His first jobs were as assistant on the collegiate level at California State University, Fullerton and California Lutheran University. Then he became a head coach at the high school level.

Redell was also a chief executive officer of Bolton & Co. Insurance Brokers in South Pasadena, California. He is married and has three sons.

Head coaching record

College

References

External links
 

1941 births
Living people
American football quarterbacks
American players of Canadian football
Canadian football quarterbacks
Cal Lutheran Kingsmen football coaches
Cal State Fullerton Titans football coaches
Calgary Stampeders players
College Football Hall of Fame inductees
Edmonton Elks players
Hamilton Tiger-Cats players
High school football coaches in California
Occidental Tigers football coaches
Occidental Tigers football players
United States Football League coaches
People from Red Bluff, California
Sportspeople from Pasadena, California
Players of American football from Pasadena, California
Players of Canadian football from Pasadena, California